Afshar Rural District is in the Central District of Takab County, West Azerbaijan province, Iran. At the National Census of 2006, its population was 4,265 in 917 households. There were 3,814 inhabitants in 1,039 households at the following census of 2011. At the most recent census of 2016, the population of the rural district was 3,335 in 1,040 households. The largest of its 26 villages was Ughul Beyg, with 930 people.

References 

Takab County

Rural Districts of West Azerbaijan Province

Populated places in West Azerbaijan Province

Populated places in Takab County